Młynowo may refer to the following places:
Młynowo, Greater Poland Voivodeship (west-central Poland)
Młynowo, Kętrzyn County in Warmian-Masurian Voivodeship (north Poland)
Młynowo, Mrągowo County in Warmian-Masurian Voivodeship (north Poland)